J. Z. George High School is a public middle and high school in North Carrollton, Mississippi. It is a part of the Carroll County School District. It is named after James Z. George.

History
Circa 1996 the number of students at George High was becoming higher. In 1999 Shirley Lester was the principal. That year there were 307 students, with a portion of them from Black Hawk. In 1999 Vaiden High School in Vaiden consolidated into J. Z. George. The new mascot of the combined school is the Jaguar. The projected consolidated enrollment was 447. In January 1999, to prepare for consolidation, the district began adding seven classrooms, five science laboratories, and other expansion, as well as renovation, totaling $3.5 million. The district used teacher evaluations to determine which teachers got jobs at the consolidated Vaiden High, with seniority used as a tiebreaker. Teachers who were not placed at the new J. Z. George worked at other schools or retired.

In 1999 Shirley Lester was the principal of J.Z. George.

In 2019 the State of Mississippi gave the school a "D" ranking because the district computed the scores as if it were one school instead of giving the scores separately for middle and high school divisions. Therefore the high school alone would have been a "C" but was given a "D" ranking inherited from the sum score. The district itself, rather than the state, made the error, so the district was not able to appeal the "D" score. Also the graduation score was incorrect because students who left J. Z. George to be in the New Resource Learning Center (NRLC) and then returned to J. Z. George upon completing NRLC were not counted as being graduates of J. Z. George.

Curriculum
As of 1999 the school was to offer both Spanish and French.

In 1988 the school added a business mathematics course.

The school has a parenting simulation program called "Baby Think it Over" to illustrate to students the demands of parenting.

Athletics
Prior to 1999 it was in league 1A, but due to the consolidation it was to move up to 2A.

Since 2006 the county granted permission for J. Z. George's baseball team to play on county land in North Carrollton. Prior to that point the team did not have a regular ball field.

See also
 Carroll Academy – Private school in Carrollton, Mississippi

References

External links
 J.Z. George High School

Public high schools in Mississippi
Public middle schools in Mississippi
Education in Carroll County, Mississippi